Máscaras is a Brazilian telenovela produced and broadcast by RecordTV. Created by Lauro César Muniz. It premiered on April 4, 2012 and ended on October 2, 2012.

Plot 
Otávio is a thriving cattle breeder in Mato Grosso do Sul. And he falls in love with Maria, a young woman from the big city. The two marry, Maria will live on the farm next to her husband, have a baby and then suffer postpartum depression. To be treated, she embarks on a therapeutic ship, created by the alternative doctor Dr. Décio. Maria returns to her husband's farm, but is kidnapped along with her son, Tavinho. Otávio decides to start life with another identity, but he does not go to great lengths to find the family. He discovers that the kidnapping has to do with a criminal organization led by Big Blond, and goes on to investigate the crime. Only time passes and, without enduring the weight of the disappearance of his loved ones, the farmer goes into depression. Dr. Decio then receives an anonymous email saying that they will both find news of Maria inside a mysterious ship. His brother-in-law, Martim, connected to Big Blond, also embarks on the same cruise and insists on accusing Otavio of his sister's disappearance. The transatlantic berths in Búzios and Martim meets with members of the Organization. Suspicious, Otávio and Décio follow the trickster and end up kidnapped. At sea, Martim ends up dying and the farmer adopts his identity to restart his life. There begins a game of mirrors, in which the hero wears the mask of the villain and the villain pretends to be a hero.

Cast

Soundtrack 
 Porto Solidão - Fagner
 Irmãos Da Lua - Renato Teixeira
 Palavras Certas - Ju 87
 Parou O Meu Mundo - Massau
 Difícil - Franco Levine
 Feito Pra Você - Celso Fonseca
 Speed Racer - Fernanda Abreu
 Sopra - Banda Vitória Régia
 Tá No Meu Coração - Bruna e Mateus
 Le Masque - Julio Cesar
 You (Nuca Soube) - Claudia Albuquerque
 Eu Preciso De Você - Rosemary
 Blue Moon - Dave Gordon
 To Fix A Broken Heart - Erikka
 Serenata - Claudio Erlan
 Mário O Sedutor - Keco Brandão

Ratings

References

External links 
  

2012 telenovelas
Brazilian telenovelas
2012 Brazilian television series debuts
2012 Brazilian television series endings
RecordTV telenovelas
Portuguese-language telenovelas